Crotalaria ledermannii is a species of plant in the family Fabaceae. It is found in Cameroon and Nigeria. Its natural habitats are subtropical or tropical dry forests, as well as subtropical or tropical dry lowland grassland. It is threatened by habitat loss.

References

ledermannii
Flora of Cameroon
Flora of Nigeria
Vulnerable plants
Taxonomy articles created by Polbot